Carl Schorlemmer FRS (30 September 1834 – 27 June 1892) was a German chemist who did research on hydrocarbons and contributed to the study of the history of chemistry.

Early life and education 
Schorlemmer was born in 1834, the son of a joiner in Darmstadt. He was able to visit Realschule and later - against the will of his poor father- trade school.  Schorlemmer started his training to become a pharmacist in 1853 in Groß-Umstadt. During his training he made own chemical experiments in the laboratory and was interested in astronomy and botany. After two and a half years he passed his exam, became an assistant pharmacist and worked in the Schwanen pharmacy in Heidelberg. Having attended some lectures of Robert Wilhelm Bunsen, he studied pharmacy and chemistry in Heidelberg and in Gießen (where he attended lectures of Heinrich Will and Hermann Kopp, a historian of chemistry). He later became demonstrator at Owens College in Manchester with Henry Enfield Roscoe.

Professorship
From 1874 on, Schorlemmer was professor of organic chemistry in Manchester.  Schorlemmer became a member of the Royal Society in the UK in 1871. In 1878, he was elected as a member to the American Philosophical Society.

Research
 research on paraffin hydrocarbons
 he proved, that "ethane" and "ethyl hydride" are identical.
 works on Aurin, rosaniline, suberone and safranin.
 a method to convert a secondary alcohol into a primary alcohol.
 research on historical aspects of chemistry

Writings
Schorlemmer wrote several books about organic chemistry, the most important one being A Treatise on Chemistry (1874), which he co-authored with Henry Roscoe. Schorlemmer is considered to have made an essential contribution to the history of chemistry as an academic field in his later works, culminating in his book The Rise and Development of Organic Chemistry.

Towards the end of his life, Schorlemmer began to write a book about the history of chemistry from  antiquity to the 17th century. He died before finishing his work, so it was never published, the manuscript covers about 1,100 pages and is stored in John Rylands Library.

Connections with Marx and Engels
Schorlemmer was a friend of Karl Marx and Friedrich Engels, who asked him for advice on scientific questions. Schorlemmer was one of the thirteen people at Marx's funeral. At Schorlmmer's death, Engels published an obituary in Vorwärts, the central organ of the Social Democratic Party of Germany. Engels said that Schorlemmer spent his holidays regularly in London with Marx and Engels when he did not visit Germany.  Engels also claimed in his obituary that Schorlemmer was open about his allegiance to the Communist cause, and that Schorlemmer was unusual in that he held the German philosopher Hegel in high regard at a time when the latter was "much despised". Engels added that, "What we know today about paraffins, we owe mainly to Schorlemmer... Thus he became one the joint founders of today's scientific organic chemistry."  For this connection with Marx and Engels, Schorlemmer is sometimes referred to as the "red" chemist.

Death
Towards the end of his life, his health got worse, he died due to a lung disease at his house in Manchester on 27.June 1892. He was unmarried.

Selected writings 
 A Manual of Chemistry of the Carbon Compounds; or, Organic Chemistry (1874)
 A Treatise on Chemistry (1877) - with Henry Roscoe
 Rise and Development of Organic Chemistry (1879)

See also 

 List of German chemists

References

 Dr. O. Krätz: Chemie in unserer Zeit / 14/ Year: 1980 Nr. 3 A27 
 J. R. Partington: A History of Chemistry; vol. 4. London: Macmillan & Co Ltd.;  New York: St. Martin's Press, 1964, pp. 774+775
 Rolf Gelius: "Carl Schorlemmer als Wissenschaftshistoriker: Zur Kenntnis seines unvollendeten Manuskripts, Beiträge zur Geschichte der Chemie"/ intern.Zs.f.Gesch.u.Ethik der Naturwiss., Techn. u. Med.4/Birkhäuser Verlag 1996 /65-81

1834 births
1892 deaths
Scientists from Darmstadt
19th-century German chemists
19th-century British chemists
Organic chemists
Fellows of the Royal Society